Geoffrey Clayton may refer to:

Geoff Clayton (1938–2018), Lancashire cricketer
Geoffrey Clayton (bishop) (1884–1957), English Anglican archbishop

See also
Jeff Clayton (1954–2020), American musician